The Port of Giurgiu is one of the largest Romanian river ports, located in the city of Giurgiu on the Danube river.

The port also has a container terminal with an annual traffic capacity of 30,000 TEU's.

References

Ports and harbours of Romania